Tanner Elle Schneider (born July 3, 1989), known professionally as Elle King, is an American singer, songwriter, musician, and actress. Her musical style is influenced by country, rock and blues. 

In 2012, King released her debut EP, The Elle King EP, on RCA; one track from that EP, "Playing for Keeps", is the theme song for VH1's Mob Wives Chicago series. 

She released her debut album, Love Stuff, in 2015. It produced the US top ten single "Ex's & Oh's", which earned her two Grammy Award nominations. King has also toured with acts such as Of Monsters and Men, Train, James Bay, The Chicks, Heart, Joan Jett, Michael Kiwanuka, and Miranda Lambert. She is the daughter of actor and comedian Rob Schneider and former model London King. King uses her mother's surname to distinguish her career and identity from her father's. "People know who my dad is," she told ABC News, "but I think that my voice and my music speaks for itself: that I am my own person."

King is a four-time Grammy Award nominee, two each in the rock and country categories, and received honors from the Country Music Association Awards and the Academy of Country Music Awards.

Early life
King was born on July 3, 1989, in Los Angeles, California, to then-Saturday Night Live cast member Rob Schneider and London King, a former model. Her parents divorced and her mother remarried. She grew up living in Ohio, between Wellston and Columbus. When she was nine, her stepfather, Justin Tesa, gave her a record by all-female hard-rock band the Donnas; she views this as the pivotal moment when she decided she wanted to be a musician. Around this time, she also started listening to the Runaways and Blondie, and she made her acting debut alongside her father in the movie Deuce Bigalow: Male Gigolo.

At the age of 13, King started playing guitar, immersing herself in the music of Otis Redding, the Yeah Yeah Yeahs, Etta James, Aretha Franklin, Al Green, Hank Williams, Johnny Cash, AC/DC (she has the phrase "dirty deeds" tattooed on her biceps), and Earl Scruggs. Her interest in the country and bluegrass of Hank Williams and Earl Scruggs inspired her to learn the banjo. During her teenage years, she attended Buck's Rock camp in Connecticut, where she starred successfully in a number of musicals.

King spent her teenage years in New York City, but she has also lived in Los Angeles, Philadelphia, and Copenhagen, Denmark. Upon graduating from Elisabeth Irwin High School/Little Red School House, she moved to Philadelphia to enroll at the University of the Arts, studying painting and film. During these college years, she had an artistic epiphany seeing a live show where the band onstage used a banjo purely for accompaniment purposes, eschewing the bluegrass and country musical vocabulary traditionally associated with the instrument. King then began to use the banjo as a compositional tool. After college, she briefly lived in Copenhagen and Los Angeles, before moving back to New York where she currently resides in Bushwick, Brooklyn.

Career

1999–2013: Career beginnings
In 1999, she debuted as an actress in her father's film Deuce Bigalow: Male Gigolo. In 2005, at age 16, she started gigging around New York City, using a fake ID to gain entry to the local nightclubs. King immersed herself in the local songwriting scene and honed her performance skills by busking around town. King was then signed by newly appointed RCA Chairman Peter Edge. Her debut single "Good To Be A Man", was released on March 13, 2012, as a digital download and also as a 7" vinyl single. On June 12, 2012, the four-song The Elle King EP was released on RCA. The EP was recorded in New York and was produced by Andy Baldwin and Chris DeStefano, with King herself producing a track. The EP's lead track, "Playing for Keeps", was chosen as the theme song for VH1's Mob Wives Chicago series that premiered on June 10, 2012, on VH1.

King was spotlighted as an "Artist to Watch in 2012" by Esquire Magazine and made television appearances on VH1 Big Morning Buzz Live and the Late Show with David Letterman. King has played Austin, Texas, at the South by Southwest Festival, as well as the Hammersmith Apollo. She has also taped her own PBS Arts In Context special for KLRU Austin at the Austin City Limits recording studio. She toured with Of Monsters and Men, Train and Michael Kiwanuka and has opened for Dashboard Confessional, Dropkick Murphys, Dry the River, James Bay and Ed Sheeran.

2014–present: Love Stuff, Shake the Spirit and Come And Get Your Wife

In September 2014, King released "Ex's & Oh's", which serves as the lead single off her debut album. She released the album, Love Stuff on February 17, 2015. She performed "Ex's & Oh's" the next day on The Today Show to promote it. The song reached number 10 on the Billboard Hot 100, becoming King's first top ten single in the United States. "Ex's & Oh's" received two nominations at the 58th Grammy Awards: Best Rock Performance and Best Rock Song. In July 2015, King supported Modest Mouse on their UK tour. "Under the Influence" and "America's Sweetheart" were later released as singles for rock radio and mainstream radio, respectively. In 2016, her single "Good Girls" featured on the Ghostbusters soundtrack and played over the movie's credits. In 2016, she teamed up with country singer Dierks Bentley for the song "Different for Girls". They performed this song at the 50th CMA Awards on November 2, 2016, when she and Bentley won the award for Musical Event of the Year.

On March 6, 2017, she premiered a new single "Wild Love" featuring a sparse electronic production, marking a slight departure from her previous style in music. King released her second studio album, Shake the Spirit, on October 19, 2018, which she made with her band the Brethren. On August 3, 2019, she was featured singing on a version of  Lindsey Stirling's "The Upside". Throughout 2019, King served as a guest co-host on the MTV series Catfish: The TV Show opposite lead host Nev Schulman.

King's third album, Come Get Your Wife, was released on January 27, 2023 and displays a move into country music.

Musical style and influences
According to The Guardian, King's musical style is "steeped in every genre of vintage Americana  – sassy rock’n’roll, vampy R&B, country sadness and a little blues." King's music was classified as blues rock by Nylon, and as alternative country by Alternative Nation. According to King, "I say that I sing a little bit of country blues, [...] it kind of changes from song to song, whatever I’m listening to or feeling. Sometimes it’s really country, sometimes it’s soulful, sometimes it’s, like, wrist-slitting folk music; sad songs." She cited Etta James, Aretha Franklin, Al Green, Otis Redding, Hank Williams, Johnny Cash and AC/DC as her musical influences.

Personal life
King started dating Andrew Ferguson in January 2016. The couple met in a hotel lobby in London and were engaged 12 days later on a sailing trip around the San Francisco Bay. They married on February 14, 2016, and confirmed their intent to divorce on May 15, 2017. On April 23, 2017, Ferguson was arrested and charged with felony domestic violence after allegedly grabbing King by the throat and threatening to kill her, though this charge was later dropped. King and Ferguson briefly reconciled in late 2017. As of October 2018, King is in a new relationship.

In 2021, it was revealed she was pregnant with her first child with tattoo artist Dan Tooker. On September 1, 2021, she gave birth to a baby boy.

King has several tattoos, and worked at a tattoo company called East Side Ink.

Discography

Studio albums
 Love Stuff (2015)
 Shake the Spirit (2018)
 Come Get Your Wife (2023)

Filmography

Concert tours

Headlining
 Love Stuff Tour (2015)
 Shake The Spirit Tour (2019)
 A-FREAKIN-MEN Tour (2022)

Opening act
 Dashboard Confessional – The Swiss Army Romance (2010)
 Of Monsters and Men – My Head Is an Animal Tour (2011)
 Train – California 37 Tour (2012)
 Michael Kiwanuka – Home Again Tour (2012)
 Dropkick Murphys – Signed and Sealed in Blood Tour (2013)
 Ed Sheeran – + Tour (2013)
 Dry the River – Alarms in the Heart Tour (2014)
 James Bay – Chaos and the Calm Tour (2015)
 Modest Mouse – Strangers to Ourselves Tour (2015)
 Maroon 5 – Maroon V Tour (2016)
 Dixie Chicks – DCX MMXVI World Tour (2016)
 Miranda Lambert – Roadside Bars and Pink Guitars Tour (2019)
 Joan Jett & Heart – Love Alive Tour (2019)
 Chris Stapleton - Chris Stapleton's All-American Road Show (2022)

Awards and nominations

References

External links
 

1989 births
Living people
American alternative country singers
American musicians of Filipino descent
American people of Jewish descent
Blues rock musicians
Musicians from Los Angeles
RCA Records artists
Singers from Ohio
Songwriters from California
Songwriters from Ohio
University of the Arts (Philadelphia) alumni
21st-century American singers
21st-century American women singers
Little Red School House alumni
People from Bushwick, Brooklyn